Jape is a synonym for a practical joke.

Jape or JAPE may also refer to:

 Jape (band), an Irish electronic/rock band
 JAPE (linguistics), a transformation language widely used in natural language processing
 JAPE, an automated pun generator
 Jape (software), a Java-based proof assistant
 Java Annotations Pattern Engine – see General Architecture for Text Engineering

See also
 Japes, a 2001 stage play by Simon Gray